Warna may refer to:
 Varna, Bulgaria, a city in Bulgaria
 Warna, a music album by Joey Alexander
 Worker Adjustment and Retraining Notification Act of 1988, or WARNA, a US law

See also 
 
 Warana, Maharashtra
 Warna Warta, a newspaper
 Warna 94.2FM, a Singaporean radio station
 Warna Agung, a football club
 Varna (disambiguation)